Lost & Found is the second compilation album by American rock band Marilyn Manson. It was released in Europe on May 5, 2008 by Polydor Records. It contains four songs from Marilyn Manson's first four studio albums and one from their only live album, The Last Tour on Earth. There are no previously unreleased songs, B-sides or rarities on the album, all tracks can be found on the band's various studio albums preceding it. As of mid-2008, Lost & Found is only available via digital download, an average rate of $2 per track. The only two songs that don't appear on most editions of Lest We Forget: The Best Of are "I Don't Like the Drugs (But the Drugs Like Me)" and "Irresponsible Hate Anthem".

Track listing

Personnel 
 Marilyn Manson – vocals, keyboards, guitar, instrumentation
 Daisy Berkowitz – guitar, programming (1, 2)
 Zim Zum – guitar (3)
 John Lowery – guitar (4, 5)
 Gidget Gein – bass (1)
 Twiggy Ramirez – bass (2–5)
 Madonna Wayne Gacy – keyboards, sampling
 Sara Lee Lucas – drums (1)
 Ginger Fish – drums, live drums, programming (2–5)

External links 
 New European Maxi CD Release "Lost & Found", The Heirophant, May 11, 2008, at MansonUSA.com Note: That link has link rot.

2008 EPs
Marilyn Manson (band) albums
Albums produced by Marilyn Manson
Albums produced by Trent Reznor
Albums produced by Dave Sardy
2008 compilation albums
Albums produced by Michael Beinhorn